George Townsend Adee (January 4, 1874 – July 31, 1948) was an American football player and tennis official.

Biography
Born in Stonington, Connecticut, Adee attended Yale University, where he was the quarterback of the school's football team. In 1894, he was selected as one of eleven players named to the 1894 College Football All-America Team. He served in the U.S. Army in the Spanish–American War and World War I. Adee was also a competitive tennis player who appeared six times US Championships singles between 1903 and 1909. In 1964, he was inducted into the International Tennis Hall of Fame for his contributions as an administrator. He served as the president of the United States Tennis Association from 1916 to 1919, and was also a member of the Davis Cup and Amateur Rules Committees. Adee died in New York, New York, in 1948 at age 74.

References

External links
 
George Adee International Tennis Hall of Fame

1874 births
1948 deaths
19th-century players of American football
American football quarterbacks
American male tennis players
Yale Bulldogs football players
All-American college football players
United States Army personnel of World War I
American military personnel of the Spanish–American War
Players of American football from Connecticut
People from Stonington, Connecticut
International Tennis Hall of Fame inductees